Miss USA 1966 was the 15th Miss USA pageant, televised live from Miami Beach, Florida, on May 21, 1966.

The pageant was won by Maria Remenyi of California, who was crowned by outgoing titleholder Sue Downey of Ohio.  Remenyi was the second woman from California to win the Miss USA title, and went on to Top 15 at Miss Universe 1966. 

Idaho and South Dakota did not send a delegate in 1966, making this the last Miss USA pageant in which not all states were represented The only subsequent pageant with fewer than 51 delegates in the live telecast – 1981 – resulted from a state representative being disqualified during the preliminary judging.

Results

Special awards

Historical significance 
 California wins competition for the second time. 
 Connecticut earns the 1st runner-up position for the second time. The last time it placed this was in 1962.
 Indiana earns the 2nd runner-up position for the first time.
 North Dakota earns the 3rd runner-up position for the first time.
 Florida earns the 4th runner-up position for the second time. The last time it placed this was in 1960.
 States that placed in semifinals the previous year were Arizona, California, District of Columbia, Hawaii, New York, Ohio, Texas and Utah.
 California and New York placed for the tenth consecutive year. 
 District of Columbia placed for the fifth consecutive year. 
 Ohio, Texas and Utah placed for the third consecutive year. 
 Arizona and Hawaii made their second consecutive placement.
 Maryland last placed in 1964.
 Massachusetts and Tennessee last placed in 1963.
 Connecticut and Indiana last placed in 1962.
 Florida last placed in 1960.
 North Dakota placed for the first time.
 Alabama and Oklahoma break an ongoing streak of placements since 1963.
 Kentucky breaks an ongoing streak of placements since 1964.

Delegates
The Miss USA 1966 delegates were:

 Alabama - Susan Scott
 Alaska - Elrita Blakensop
 Arizona - Roxanne Neeley
 Arkansas - Peggy Jones
 California - Maria Remenyi
 Colorado - Kim Kelly
 Connecticut - Pat Denne
 Delaware - Jacqueline Kalazinskas
 District of Columbia - Sue Counts
 Florida - Randy Beard
 Georgia - Flora Goddard
 Hawaii - Judith Wolski
 Illinois - Cheryl Setser
 Indiana - Elaine Richards
 Iowa - Janis Mieras
 Kansas - Pat Ravenscroft
 Kentucky - Jennifer Burcham
 Louisiana - Tanya Becnel
 Maine - Susan Bartash
 Maryland - Roselaine Zetter
 Massachusetts - Nancy Brackett
 Michigan - Kathleen Blascak
 Minnesota - Patricia Thatcher
 Mississippi - Jane Sutherland
 Missouri - Martha Taylor
 Montana - Carol Boetcher
 Nebraska - Karen Weinfurtner
 Nevada - Mary Martin
 New Hampshire - Elaine Brandt
 New Jersey - Jo Ann Franchi
 New Mexico - Susan Franz
 New York - Nancy Self
 North Carolina - Brenda Moye
 North Dakota - Judy Slayton
 Ohio - Karen Dietz
 Oklahoma - Melva Brown
 Oregon - Sharon Gerritz
 Pennsylvania - Barbara Levitt
 Rhode Island - Barbara Williams
 South Carolina - Joselyn Alarie
 Tennessee - Mary Margaret Smith
 Texas - Dorothy Pickens
 Utah - Denice Blair
 Vermont - Peggy Eckert
 Virginia - Beverly Johnson
 Washington - Sandra Carlile
 West Virginia - Annette Peery
 Wisconsin - Janet Driscoll
 Wyoming - Linda Leafdale

No state delegate: Idaho, South Dakota

External links 
 

1966
1966 in the United States
1966 beauty pageants